Wakunai Rural LLG is a local-level government (LLG) of the Autonomous Region of Bougainville, Papua New Guinea.

Wards
02. Ewara / Papana
03. Auta
04. Rotokas
05. Rikua
06. Toisiko
07. Assigoro
08. Usireio
09. Lower Aeta/Rau Coe
10. Bohi
87. Wakunai Urban

References

Local-level governments of the Autonomous Region of Bougainville